Portal is the debut album of Windy & Carl, self-released in November, 1994.

Track listing

Personnel 
Musicians
Carl Hultgren – guitar, keyboards, percussion
Windy Weber – bass guitar, vocals
Production and additional personnel
Ligia Bouton – painting
Jacques Cohen – assistant engineering, mastering
Brenda Markovich – chimes on "Awhile (Reprise)"
Randall Nieman – guitar on "Awhile (Reprise)"

References 

1994 debut albums
Windy & Carl albums